Mecometopus aurantisignatus is a species of beetle in the family Cerambycidae. It was described by Zajciw in 1964.

References

Mecometopus
Beetles described in 1964